Brigitte Fontaine est... folle ! is the third album by experimental French singer Brigitte Fontaine, released in 1968 on the Saravah label. Fontaine herself considers this album to be her first real album. Jean-Claude Vannier authors the arrangements of the album.

Track listing

1968 albums
Albums arranged by Jean-Claude Vannier
Brigitte Fontaine albums